SS Violet was a passenger paddle steamer operated by the London and North Western Railway from 1880 to 1902. (PS is a later designation used to differentiate paddle steamers from propeller steamships)

History
She was built by Laird Brothers, Birkenhead for the London and North Western Railway in 1880. They were intended to operate a new overnight service between Holyhead and Dublin. The service previously had only been during the daytime.

She was sold in 1902 to Liverpool and Douglas Steamers Ltd.

Specification

In 1883 The Engineer published specifications for Violet (and sister ship Lily) as follows: 

Dimensions : 310 feet long overall, 300 feet 6 inches between perpendiculars, 33 feet beam, drawing 14ft 4inches.

Passengers : Certified by Board of Trade to carry 475 deck passengers and 415 saloon passengers.

Engines : Twin cylinder oscillating engines with jet condensers. Cylinder bore 78 inches, stroke 7 feet with double piston rods and crossheads. Crankshaft 18inch diameter. Each cylinder had two slide-valves operated by link motion. Mean indicated horsepower over 3 hours is 3220 and propeller speed is 30 revolutions per minute.

Boilers : Eight rectangular boilers supplying steam at 30 psi. The boilers contained a total of 2152 tubes, total heating surface of 12215 square feet, and total grate area of 470 square feet.

Paddle Wheels : 27 feet 8 inches diameter, with floats 11 feet wide, and 4 feet 6 inches deep.

On the Holyhead to Kingstown crossing she was about 15 minutes faster than the earlier ships Shamrock and Rose.

References

1880 ships
Passenger ships of the United Kingdom 
Steamships
Ships built on the River Mersey
Ships of the London and North Western Railway 
Paddle steamers of the United Kingdom
Steamships of the United Kingdom